Alan Lionel Minaglia (born 16 July 1992) is an Argentine professional footballer who plays as a goalkeeper.

Career
Minaglia began his career in Mataderos with Nueva Chicago. Minaglia was unused on the bench while the club was participating in the 2015 Primera División, but went on to make his professional bow in Primera B Nacional, after relegation, on 16 April 2016 versus Guillermo Brown. That was one of three appearances in 2016, with the final one coming in a 6–4 victory over Villa Dálmine. He featured fourteen further times across the next two campaigns. In July 2022 Minaglia joined Bulgarian club Botev Vratsa.

Career statistics
.

References

External links

1992 births
Living people
Footballers from Buenos Aires
Argentine footballers
Association football goalkeepers
Primera Nacional players
Nueva Chicago footballers